The Sunuci (or Sinuci or Sunici) was the name of a tribal grouping with a particular territory within the Roman province of Germania Inferior, which later became Germania Secunda. Within this province, they were in the Civitas Agrippinenses, with its capital at Cologne. They are thought to have been a Germanic tribe, speaking a Germanic language, although they may also have had a mixed ancestry. They lived between the Meuse (Dutch Maas, Latin Mosa) and Rur rivers in Roman imperial times. In modern terms this was probably in the part of Germany near Aachen, Jülich, Eschweiler and Düren, and the neighbouring areas in the southern Netherlands, around Valkenburg, and eastern Belgium, in part of the old Duchy of Limburg. There is a town just over the Belgian border from Aachen called Sinnich, in Voeren, which may owe its name to them. In other words, they lived just north of the modern northern limits of Romance languages derived from Latin.

Name 
The etymology of the name Sunici is uncertain. It could derive from the Proto-Indo-European (PIE) root *sūs, *suwós ('pig'), or alternatively from PIE *sunus ('sons'). The name may thus be interpreted as meaning 'the young sons', which evokes the Italic custom of the Ver Sacrum. Since the word *sunus is absent from Celtic languages (which replaced it with *makʷo-), the ethnonym is more probably of Germanic origin in this scenario.

Geography 
The Sunuci dwelled in the western part of the modern Rhineland region, around the towns of Eschweiler, Heimbach, or Kornelimünster. Their territory was located between that of the Tungri and Ubii.

Religion 
Dedications to their eponymous goddess Sunucsal(is) have been found across their territory. She was probably regarded as the original epithet of a tribal goddess. The name may be interpreted as the Germanic form *Sunuc(a)-saliō- ('whom provides the Sunici with housing').

History 
The origins of the tribe are unknown, but it is likely that, like their eastern neighbours the Ubii, their ancestry included Germanic immigrants from the east of the Rhine who had been arriving for generations. Like the Cugerni for example, they may descend from Sicambri. Germania Inferior was on the west of the Rhine and had been described by Julius Caesar, at the time of Roman conquest of the area, as part of Belgic Gaul. Many of the tribal names and personal names which he reported from this area, are considered to be Celtic, not Germanic. However already long before his time there appears to have been an influx of people coming from the east of the Rhine, including, in the particular area where the Sunuci lived, the tribal grouping which Tacitus later claimed to be the original tribal group which had been called "Germani", the so-called "Germani Cisrhenani". Whether these original Germani had all spoken a Germanic language is unknown. Caesar and Tacitus were more interested in the fact that tribes from the east of the Rhine, who all eventually came to be referred to as Germani (the source of the modern word "Germany"), and all eventually came to speak a Germanic language, were less softened by civilization, and therefore difficult to defeat in battle or incorporate into the Roman empire.

Some specific tribes who entered the empire later, such as the Ubii who lived between the Rur and the Rhine, are generally understood to be speakers of Germanic languages, and records exist concerning their immigration and settlement. However, for the Sunuci, there is no such clear record and it is their position which generally leads to them being understood as being a group settled during imperial times, and Germanic in the modern sense of speaking a Germanic language. On the other hand, there have been suggestions that they might represent the descendants, at least partly, of the Segni, one of the Germani tribes described by Caesar as having been in this region since at least the 2nd century BCE when the Cimbri moved through the area.

In the Naturalis Historia of Pliny the Elder described the Sunuci between the Tungri and the Frisiavones. They contributed troops to the Roman military, some of whom were stationed in Britain, including modern Wales. There is evidence from tablets found in the Rivelin Valley south of Stannington that retiring Roman auxiliaries of the Sunuci tribe stationed in Britain were made grants of citizenship and land or money in the modern day city of Sheffield, with some speculation that a Roman villa complex at Whirlow Hall Farm was part of such a land grant.
Tacitus also mentioned the Sunuci, as a people of this region during the Batavian revolt. Some of them joined the revolt of Gaius Julius Civilis, and were opposed by Claudius Labeo, who held a bridge over the Meuse, with a force of Betasii, Tungri and Nervii

Two deity names have been associated with the Sunuci, a goddess Sunuxal or Sunuxsal and a god Varnenos or Varneno.

What happened to Sunuci in the later part of the Roman era is uncertain. Their territory became the home of new groups who crossed the Rhine, part of the amalgamation of tribes known as the Franks. The Franks united under kings and later became semi-independent within the empire, started moving into more populated Romanized areas to their south, and then proceeded to conquer a large part of Western Europe and found the Holy Roman empire. If any of the Sunuci remained in the area, they became part of this development.

References

Bibliography

Early Germanic peoples
Tribes of pre-Roman Gaul
Germania Inferior
History of Cologne